The council of the Langeberg Local Municipality (formerly the Breede River/Winelands Local Municipality) consists of twenty-three members elected by mixed-member proportional representation. Twelve councillors are elected by first-past-the-post voting in twelve wards, while the remaining eleven are chosen from party lists so that the total number of party representatives is proportional to the number of votes received. In the election of 1 November 2021 the Democratic Alliance (DA) obtained a plurality of ten seats.

Results 
The following table shows the composition of the council after past elections.

December 2000 election

The following table shows the results of the 2000 election.

By-elections from December 2000 to October 2002
The following by-elections were held to fill vacant ward seats in the period between the election in December 2000 and the floor crossing period in October 2002.

October 2002 floor crossing

In terms of the Eighth Amendment of the Constitution and the judgment of the Constitutional Court in United Democratic Movement v President of the Republic of South Africa and Others, in the period from 8–22 October 2002 councillors had the opportunity to cross the floor to a different political party without losing their seats. In the Breede River/Winelands council, one councillor crossed from the African National Congress (ANC) to the Democratic Alliance, while the single councillors for the Alliance for the Community, Civic Alliance and People's Forum all crossed to the ANC.

By-elections from October 2002 to March 2006
The following by-elections were held to fill vacant ward seats in the period between the floor crossing period in October 2002 and the election in March 2006.

March 2006 election

The following table shows the results of the 2006 election.

By-elections from March 2006 to May 2011 
The following by-elections were held to fill vacant ward seats in the period between the elections in March 2006 and May 2011.

May 2011 election

On 28 August 2009, the Breede River/Winelands Local Municipality was renamed to the Langeberg Municipality.

The following table shows the results of the 2011 election.

By-elections from May 2011 to August 2016 
The following by-elections were held to fill vacant ward seats in the period between the elections in May 2011 and August 2016.

August 2016 election

The following table shows the results of the 2016 election.

The local council sends three representatives to the council of the Cape Winelands District Municipality: two from the Democratic Alliance and one from the African National Congress.

November 2021 election

The following table shows the results of the 2021 election.

Notes

References

Langeberg
Elections in the Western Cape
Cape Winelands District Municipality